Prato Sesia is a comune (municipality) in the Province of Novara in the Italian region Piedmont, located about  northeast of Turin and about  northwest of Novara.

Prato Sesia borders the following municipalities: Boca, Cavallirio, Grignasco, Romagnano Sesia, and Serravalle Sesia.

References

Cities and towns in Piedmont